Karagaysky (masculine), Karagayskaya (feminine), or Karagayskoye (neuter) may refer to:
Karagaysky District, a district of Perm Krai, Russia
Karagaysky (rural locality), a rural locality (a settlement) in Chelyabinsk Oblast, Russia